Live at the Loosdrecht Jazz Festival is a live album by Music Inc. led by American jazz trumpeter Charles Tolliver recorded in 1972 and first released as a double LP on the Strata-East label, later released on CD as Grand Max  by the Black Lion label

Reception

The Allmusic review by Scott Yanow says "Tolliver's music (which holds on to one's attention throughout the live set) has its connections to the bebop tradition but also forges ahead and can be quite passionate. Recommended".

Track listing
All compositions by Charles Tolliver except as indicated
 "Grand Max" - 11:06
 "Truth" - 10:13
 "Prayer for Peace" (Stanley Cowell) - 15:08
 "Our Second Father" - 15:57
 "Repetition" (Neal Hefti) - 12:37

Personnel
Charles Tolliver - trumpet
John Hicks - piano
Reggie Workman - bass
Alvin Queen - drums

References

1973 live albums
Charles Tolliver live albums
Strata-East Records live albums